Mhow, officially Dr. Ambedkar Nagar, is a town in the Indore district in Madhya Pradesh state of India. The town was renamed as Dr. Ambedkar Nagar in 2003, by the Government of Madhya Pradesh.

Etymology
Some articles in popular literature state that 'MHOW' stands for Military Headquarters Of War. However, this is a backronym, and there is no proof to support the theory that the name of the village comes from the acronym. The village near Mhow was called Mhow Gaon in the Mughal/Maratha eras, when English was not used in India. The Cantonment which came up in 1818 during the Third Anglo-Maratha War, came to be known as Mhow Cantt after the name of this village. Sir John Malcolm spelt the name of this town as MOW in his writings. The 1918 edition of Encyclopædia Britannica also mentions 'MAU'. However, the Cantonment was referred to by British officers as Mhow at least as early as the end of 1823 (letter from Lt Edward Squibb to his father in London).

History
This cantonment town was founded in 1818 by John Malcolm as a result of the Treaty of Mandsaur between the English and the Holkars who were the Maratha Maharajas of Indore. John Malcolm's forces had defeated the Holkars of the Maratha Confederacy at the Battle of Mahidpur on 21 December 1817. It was after this battle that the capital of the Holkars shifted from the town of Maheshwar on the banks of the Narmada to Indore.

Mhow used to be the headquarters of the 5th (Mhow) Division of the Southern Command during the British Raj. Today this small town is associated with the Indian Army and with B. R. Ambedkar who was born here.

Mhow was a meter gauge railway district headquarters during the British Raj and even after 1947. Mhow finally has a broad gauge connection with Indore but regular train services are yet to commence.

According to Hindu religious texts, Janapav Kuti near Mhow is said to be the birthplace of Parashurama, an avatar of Vishnu.

Climate 
Mhow has a pleasant climate more often than not, however the peak summer and winter periods may get extremely hot and cold, respectively. Temperatures may go as high as 43 degrees Celsius during summers and as low as 4 degrees Celsius during winter.

Demographics
 India census, Mhow had a population of 85,023. Males constitute 54% of the population and females 46%. Mhow has an average literacy rate of 72%, higher than the national average of 59.5%; male literacy is 78%, and female literacy is 65%. The Mhow Cantt Cantonment Board has population of 81,702 of which 43,888 are males while 37,814 are females as per report released by Census India 2011.

Population of Children with age of 0-6 is 9308 which is 11.39% of total population of Mhow Cantt (CB). In Mhow Cantt Cantonment Board, Female Sex Ratio is of 862 against state average of 931. Moreover, Child Sex Ratio in Mhow Cantt is around 908 compared to Madhya Pradesh state average of 918. Literacy rate of Mhow Cantt city is 85.78%; higher than state average of 69.32%. In Mhow Cantt, Male literacy is around 90.42% while female literacy rate is 80.37%.

Cantonment 

As early as 1818, the Indian Army has had a presence in Mhow. Up until World War II, Mhow was the headquarters of the 5th Division of the Southern Army. According to local legend, Winston Churchill also spent a few months in Mhow when he was a subaltern serving with his regiment in India. The house on the mall where he is supposed to have lived, gradually crumbled due to neglect and age. It was pulled down and a jogger's park has been built on its grounds by the Infantry School.

Mhow houses three premier training institutions of the Indian Army; The Infantry School, The Military College of Telecommunication Engineering (MCTE) and The Army War College.

In addition to these institutes, Mhow is where Army Training Command or ARTRAC was born. ARTRAC was based in Mhow from 1991 to 1994, before it shifted to Shimla (Himachal Pradesh). At that time its General Officer Commanding in Chief (GOC-in-C) was Lt. General Shankar Roy Chowdhary who went on to become the Chief of Army Staff (COAS). Its first GOC-in-C was Lt. General A.S. Kalkat who had earlier commanded the Indian Peace Keeping Force (IPKF) in Sri Lanka.  ARTRAC was housed in the campus of the present Army School. This was used as All Arms Wing of MCTE for many decades. It was originally built and used as the British Military Hospital (BMH).

The Infantry School
The Infantry School is a training establishment of the Indian Army. It is responsible for the training of officers and infantry. The Commando Wing of this school is in Belgaum, Karnataka. The Army Marksmanship Unit (AMU) is a part of the Infantry School and has produced many medal winning shooters. Field Marshal Sam Manekshaw was the first Indian Commandant of this school in 1955-56 when he was a Brigadier. The present
Commandant is Lt Gen PN Ananthanarayanan.

Military College of Telecommunication Engineering (MCTE)
The first training institution in Mhow, MCTE was known as the School of Signals till 1967. It is the alma mater of the Corps of Signals. MCTE conducts telecommunications and information technology courses for officers, JCOS, NCOs and soldiers of the Indian Army. Officers and men from other countries also attend courses there. It also trains gentlemen cadets for a bachelor's degree in engineering at the Cadets Training Wing (CTW). On completion of their training, most of the cadets get commissioned into the Indian Army's Corps of Signals, however, some are also commissioned into other branches. Indian Army has also set up a Quantum Computing and an Artificial Intelligence centre at MCTE.
The present Commandant is Lt Gen MU Nair, AVSM.

The Army War College

Army War College, Mhow (AWC) is a tactical training and research institution of the Indian Army. It develops and evaluates concepts and doctrines for tactics and logistics. The college trains about 1,200 officers, as well as paramilitary forces each year.

The college was originally established as the College of Combat at Mhow on 1 April 1971. It was spun out of the Infantry School, Mhow. It continued to operate from the campus of the Infantry School until 1988, when the college moved to its new campus. In 2003, the college was renamed as the Army War College, Mhow.

The college mainly conducts three courses—the Junior Command (JC) course, the Senior Command (SC) course and the Higher Command (HC) course. The former Chiefs of Army Staff (COAS) General K. Sundarji and General V. N. Sharma have served as the Commandant of the college. The present commandant is Lt Gen Dushyant Singh, PVSM, AVSM.

Government and politics
Mhow has one seat in the State Legislative Assembly (the Vidhan Sabha). The first elected MLA (Member of Legislative Assembly) was R.C. Jall (Indian National Congress) who belonged to the Parsi community.

Since 2008, the MLA from Mhow is Kailash Vijayvargiya of the BJP who was the Urban Administration Minister in the cabinet of Chief Minister Shivraj Singh Chouhan. Previous MLA: Antar Singh Darbar of the Indian National Congress.

Until 2009, Mhow Tehsil was part of the Indore Lok Sabha constituency. Under the delimitation exercise carried out all over the nation, Mhow is now in the Dhar Parliamentary constituency though it continues to be in Indore district for administrative purposes. Present Member of Parliament for Mhow is the Dhar MP Chhatar Singh Darbar of the BJP.

Mhow (and the rest of MP) went to the polls on Monday 25 November 2013. Mhow recorded what could well be its highest ever turnout in a Vidhan Sabha election - 78.11%. Total number of voters 220,553. As per Mhow Control Room: Men constitute 79.34% and Women 76.76% with Overall - 78.11%.

On 8 December 2013 Kailash Vijayvargiya of the BJP was declared the winner from Mhow Vidhan Sabha constituency. He defeated Antar Singh Darbar of the Indian National Congress.

On 11 December 2018 Usha Thakur of the BJP was declared the winner from Mhow Vidhan Sabha constituency. She defeated Antar Singh Darbar of the Indian National Congress.

Rajendra Harshwal was the first vice chairman of MHOW cantonment for BJP. Then also became a state minister (vice chairman) of Madhya Pradesh forest development corporation in Government of Madhya Pradesh in 2003.

Tourism 

Tourist spots in and around Mhow include:
 Bhim Janmabhoomi, a memorial
 Patalpani waterfall
 Janapav hill Temple
Christ Church, Mhow
JamGate

Janapav

The river Chambal which flows through the dacoit infested areas of northern India is said to begin at the hill of Janapav which is in a village named Kuti, around 15 km from Mhow town. On top of the hill of Janapav is a temple and ashram. According to local legend this used to be the ashram of Jamadagni, the father of Parashurama (an Avatar or reincarnation of Vishnu, the Hindu God of sustenance). A mela, or religious fair, is held at Kuti every year on the auspicious day of Kartik Purnima - the first full moon after Diwali, which is also celebrated as Guru Nanak's birthday by the Sikh community - and people from villages far and near come to pray and pay their obeisance. The next day the same mela shifts to the Balaji temple in Badgonda village.

The river Gambhir which eventually joins the Kshipra - the river on whose banks the ancient, holy city of Ujjain is built - also begins at the hill of Janapav. From there it flows north towards Mhow.

Infantry Research Center & Museum - Mhow

A world-class and one of its kind Indian Army Museum showcasing the history, courage, valour, and sacrifices of the Infantry as the ultimate cutting-edge combat arm, has been established at Mhow.

Transport 

The railway station, a meter gauge line, was founded in the 1870s as part of the Holkar State Railway. Mhow was connected to Indore and Khandwa by metre gauge railway lines. On 18 January 2008, the work of broad gauge track between Mhow-Indore was completed in 2016 and the services are currently active. On the other side the work is in progress for the gauge conversion to Khandwa. 
The cost of the gauge conversion would be about Rs.1421.25 crore and Mhow has YDM-4 Metre Gauge(M.G) locomotives in Ratlam diesel loco shed.
The Patalpani Kalakund Ghat Section will function as a heritage railway from 25 December 2018.

The nearest airport is Indore.

In popular culture 
Some books about Mhow include:

 Diaries and letters from India, 1895-1900 by Violet Jacob; Non fiction
 Last Post At Mhow by Arthur Hawkey; London: Jarrolds, 1969; Non fiction
 Chinnery's Hotel by Jaysinh Birjepatil; Ravi Dayal Publishers (India); 2005; fiction

There are references to Mhow in the works of Rudyard Kipling:

 His poem "The Ladies"
 A reference to the train from Ajmer to Mhow in Chapter 1 of The Man Who Would Be King (1888)
 A reference to Mhow in chapter 11 of Kim (1901)

Notable people 
 B.R. Ambedkar, Indian politician and architect of India's constitution, was born in Mhow. His father Ramji Maloji Sakpal was posted here as a Subedar Major in a battalion of the British Indian Army's Mahar Regiment. A memorial to Dr. Ambedkar in the shape of a Buddhist stupa is being built at a spot where his father's quarters used to be. It is located by the Mhow-Mandleshwar Highway (State Highway 1) and is in the Kali Paltan area of Mhow.
 Shankar Lakshman, Indian hockey goalkeeper from Mhow (Indore)
 Subedar Major Vijay Kumar (sport shooter), AVSM, SM (Retd) of the 16th Battalion Dogra Regiment, Indian Army won a silver medal at the London Olympics 2012 in the 25m rapid fire pistol event. He had been posted at the Army Marksmanship Unit (AMU) Mhow from 2003 till 2017. 
Kishan Lal, captain of Indian Hockey Team which won gold at the 1948 London Olympics belonged to Mhow. In the domestic circuit he played for the Indian Railways.
 In August 2004 Col (then Major) Rajyavardhan Singh Rathore of the Grenadier Regiment won a silver medal in the shooting event of the Athens Olympics. At that time Major (now Col) Rathore was posted to the Army Marksmanship Unit (AMU) Mhow.
 Mukesh Kumar, eminent golfer belongs to Mhow. 
 The English cricketer and footballer Denis Compton was stationed in Mhow during World War II and he had played cricket for the Holkar (Indore) team in the Ranji Trophy (India's National Cricket Championship).
 Adela Florence Nicolson, pen name Laurence Hope (1865-1904) a leading poet of the late 19th century and early 20th century lived in Mhow from 1895 to 1900 with her husband Major General Malcolm Hassels Nicolson of the Bombay Presidency Army.
 Violet Jacob Scottish writer and illustrator was in Mhow from 1895 to 1900 when her husband Major Arthur Otway Jacob was posted here. Her book Diaries and letters from India 1895–1900 is about her years in Mhow. She visited Mhow again in the 1920s.
 Dorothy Gill, opera singer and actress was born in Mhow
 J. G. Greig, Cricketer, born in Mhow
 Rajeev John George (1970–2005): A housing rights activist

Universities and colleges 
 Dr. B.R. Ambedkar University of Social Sciences
 Army War College, Mhow
 BANISS
 Military College of Telecommunication Engineering
 College of Veterinary Sciences and Animal Husbandry, Mhow

References

External links 

 Mhow cantonment
 Mhow Ki Khabrein - A blog dedicated to Mhow

 
Articles containing potentially dated statements from 2001
B. R. Ambedkar
All articles containing potentially dated statements
Cities in Malwa
Cantonments of India
Cantonments of British India
Cities and towns in Indore district